In October 2015, 19-year-old Lucas from Chadwicks, New York, died from injuries sustained during an hours-long 'counseling' session at his church, the Word of Life Christian Church in Chadwicks, Oneida County, New York. Both he and his 17-year old brother (who survived, albeit with severe injuries), were repeatedly beaten by parishioners during the session, and among those indicted in connection with the beating were Leonard's own parents and older sister.

Background 
The Chadwicks Word of Life Christian Church reportedly started out as an ordinary Pentecostal church before becoming ever more cult-like after pastor Jerry Irwin retook control and began shaming and controlling other members. One of Irwin's relatives accused Lucas of having been involved in witchcraft and voodoo, but these accusations were refuted by police. Authorities have stated that the torture was instead prompted by Lucas' desire to leave the church.

Incident 
On the night of October 11, 2015, following a Sunday church meeting, Leonard was allegedly subject to an all-night counseling session in the church attended by about 30 parishioners, including his parents and older sister. The meeting was reportedly held after Leonard expressed a desire to leave the church. Lucas and his 17-year-old brother, Christopher, were allegedly beaten continuously. According to witness testimony, the session lasted 14 hours and ended when the parishioners thought Lucas was dead. Lucas died in hospital the next day. Autopsy results revealed "multiple contusions from blunt-force trauma to the torso and extremities", including blows to the genital area.

Indictments and investigation 
A grand jury handed down indictments to Leonard's parents, Bruce and Deborah Leonard, for first-degree manslaughter; it also indicted four other church members, including Leonard's older sister, Sarah Ferguson. Animals subsequently rescued from Lucas' parents' house were found to have been living in neglect, and the house was foul-smelling and full of garbage.

Neighbors described the church as isolated from the local community and as a cult, with one saying that "church members used to build fires on the roofs, and there was chanting and weird rituals", and that dogs howled all night inside the church but were never seen outside. Cult expert Rick Ross said "This is an old-school group...It’s typical in many ways. They’re very isolated, they've cocooned their members and homeschooled the children. Besides a web site to sell pedigree yorkies, they were very isolated. That’s a common characteristic in cults to make sure they are the only ones influencing the member’s judgements." A former member said that parents were routinely encouraged to beat their children as punishment for getting bad grades.

Following the incident, the pastor of the unrelated Word Of Life Assembly of God Church in Baldwinsville, New York, began receiving threatening phone calls from people confusing his church with the one in Chadwicks. The Chadwicks church, despite being Pentecostal, is not affiliated with Assembly of God or any other denomination, and is not overseen by any larger organization.

The townspeople held a prayer vigil outside the church on October 20. The organizers of the prayer vigil also called for Word of Life to be shut down.

Legal proceedings 
Lucas's surviving brother, Christopher Leonard, began testifying in court starting on October 21. He said that during the beating, he was punched in the stomach, then struck on the genitals and other parts of his body with a  "whip" made from an electrical cord. Later on, he was forced to wear ear plugs and ear muffs, and to sit in a corner. He said the church's pastor, Tiffanie Irwin, was responsible for organizing the counseling session during which the beating took place. When he saw his brother lying motionless on the floor, Christopher attempted to give him CPR but stopped once he realized Lucas was dead.

On October 23, a family court hearing was held to determine who should have custody of the Leonards' seven other underage children, aged between 2 and 15.

Convictions 
As of January 9, 2017 the disposition of the cases against the nine people involved on the assault on Lucas Leonard are as follows (partial Update Dec. 19. 2018):

Bruce Leonard, the father, who whipped both boys during the session pleaded guilty to felony assault was sentenced to 10 years in state prison.

Deborah Leonard, the mother, who whipped them during the session pleaded guilty to felony assault, and was sentenced to five years in state prison.

On September 1, 2016 half sister Sarah Ferguson was sentenced to 25 years in prison after being convicted in July 2016 of manslaughter and assault.

Pastor Tiffanie Irwin, age 29, who called for the so-called counseling session and oversaw its organization was sentenced on Dec. 19, 2016 to 12 years in state prison for manslaughter.

Joseph Irwin was sentenced on Dec. 19 to eight years in prison for gang assault.

David Morey was sentenced on Jan. 9, 2017 to five years in prison for assault.

Linda Morey who pulled the power cord out of the closet was sentenced on Jan. 9 to five years in prison for assault.

Traci Irwin, 50, and Daniel Irwin, 25, both pleaded guilty to unlawful imprisonment. 
Traci Irwin, was sentenced to one year for each count. On March 24, 2017 Traci Irwin was set free after serving one year and five months in jail.

Daniel Irwin received two years in jail. On March 24, 2017 Daniel Irwin was set free after serving one year and five months in jail.

References

External links 
Without a Prayer: The Death of Lucas Leonard and How One Church Became a Cult
Word of Life Church’s Path From Bible Group to Lethal Sect

2015 deaths
2015 in New York (state)
Deaths by beating in the United States
Deaths by person in New York (state)
Filicides in New York (state)
Fratricides
Incidents of violence against boys
October 2015 crimes in the United States
Oneida County, New York
Religiously motivated violence in the United States
Violence against men in North America